Éditions Gallimard, formerly Éditions de la Nouvelle Revue Française (1911–1919) and Librairie Gallimard (1919–1961), is one of the leading French book publishers. In 2003 it and its subsidiaries published 1,418 titles.

Founded by Gaston Gallimard in 1911, the publisher is now majority-owned by his grandson Antoine Gallimard.

Éditions Gallimard is a subsidiary of Groupe Madrigall, the third largest French publishing group.

History 
The publisher was founded on 31 May 1911 in Paris by Gaston Gallimard, André Gide, and Jean Schlumberger as Les Éditions de la Nouvelle Revue Française (NRF).

From its 31 May 1911 founding until June 1919, Nouvelle Revue Française published one hundred titles including La Jeune Parque by Paul Valéry. NRF published the second volume of In Search of Lost Time, In the Shadow of Young Girls in Flower, which became the first Prix Goncourt-awarded book published by the company. Nouvelle Revue Française adopted the name "Librairie Gallimard" in 1919.

During the occupation of France in World War II, Gaston Gallimard was hosted in Carcassonne by poet Joë Bousquet. He returned to Paris in October 1940 to enter discussions with the Third Reich authorities, who wished to control his publishing company. It was agreed that Gaston Gallimard would still control his company if he collaborated with the authorities and published pro-Hitler writings.

Catalogue 
Éditions Gallimard's best-selling authors include Albert Camus (29 million copies), Antoine de Saint-Exupéry (26.3 million copies) and J. K. Rowling (whose Harry Potter series sold 26 million copies). Other important authors include Salman Rushdie, Roald Dahl, Marcel Proust, Louis-Ferdinand Céline, Philip Roth, George Orwell, Jack Kerouac, Pablo Neruda and John Steinbeck.

As of 2011, its catalog consists of 36 Prix Goncourt winners, 38 writers who have received the Nobel Prize in Literature, and ten writers who have been awarded the Pulitzer Prize. In 2010 the company had a turnover of  million, and over 1,000 employees.

Gallimard acquired Groupe Flammarion from RCS MediaGroup in 2012.

Subsidiaries

Publishing houses
 Éditions Denoël
 Les Éditions du Mercure de France
 Nouveaux Loisirs (tourist guides)
 Groupe Flammarion
 Futuropolis
 Gallimard Jeunesse
  (88%)
 Éditions de La Table Ronde
 Bibliothèque de la Pléiade

Diffusion and distribution
 SODIS
 SOCADIS (joint venture with Flammarion)
 Centre de Diffusion de l'Édition
 France Export Diffusion

List of "collections"

See also
 Books in France

References

External links
 
 

Gallimard
French brands
French business families
French speculative fiction publishers
Gallimard family